Polarity is a studio album by American hip hop group Norman, consisting of rappers Onry Ozzborn and Barfly, both members of the Pacific Northwest hip hop collective Oldominion. It was released on Under The Needle on March 4, 2003. The album is a rap opera concept album.

Music 
The album is mostly produced by Onry Ozzborn and Smoke M2D6, with contributions from Pale Soul. Guest appearances include Pale Soul, Hyena, Sulfur, Toni Hill, and MyG.

Background 
Polarity casts Onry Ozzborn and Barfly as the mind of a young man named Norman. Throughout the album, the rappers communicate as Norman's conscious, revealing him as the everyday loser, who continually faces depression and counts of aggression.

Track listing

References

External links 
 Polarity at Discogs

2003 albums
Alternative hip hop albums by American artists
Onry Ozzborn albums
Concept albums
Rap operas